Alt or ALT may refer to:

Abbreviations for words
 Alt account, an alternative online identity also known as a sock puppet account
 Alternate character, in online gaming
 Alternate route, type of highway designation
 Alternating group, mathematical group of even permutations
 Alternative lifestyle
 Alternative rock
 Alternator
 Alternative subculture or youth subculture, particularly with regard to fashion or aesthetics ("alt fashion," "alt aesthetics")
 Altimeter
 Altitude

Acronyms and initialisms
 Aboriginal Land Trust, a type of organisation in Australia
 Alanine transaminase, a liver enzyme of the transaminase family
 Alternative lengthening of telomeres, in cellular biology
 Approach and Landing Tests, in space transportation
 Argon laser trabeculoplasty, a type of glaucoma surgery
 Assistant Language Teacher, in Japan
 Association for Learning Technology, in Oxford, England
 Association for Linguistic Typology
 Accelerated life testing, testing a product in excess of its normal service parameters
 International Conference on Algorithmic Learning Theory, a conference in theoretical computer science

Places and geographical features 
 Alt, Greater Manchester, formerly a constituent parish of Limehurst Rural District, near Oldham, England
 River Alt, in Merseyside, England
 Olt (river), river in Romania
Altoona Transportation Center, Pennsylvania, U.S. (Amtrak code ALT)
Altrincham station, in Altrincham, England (National Rail station code ALT)

People 
 Alt (surname)
 A.L.T. (born 1970), Mexican-American rapper
André Leon Talley, fashion magazine editor

Music 
 ALT (band), Andy White, Liam Ó Maonlaí, Tim Finn
 ALT (album), a 2012 music album by Van der Graaf Generator
 ALT (EP), a 2015 EP by Vanna
 Alt-J, band
 in alt, singing in the octave above the treble staff (G5 to F6)
 ALT, a robotic singer with songs in the Bemani game series including Pop'n Music, Reflec Beat and Jubeat

Technology 
 Southern Altai language (ISO-639-3 code "alt")
 Alt attribute, in HTML computer language
 Alt key, on a computer keyboard
 ALT Linux, computer software
 alt.* hierarchy, in USENET newsgroups

Other
 Altbier, German beer
 Alt (film), a 2013 Venezuelan short film
 Alt-right, an abbreviation of alternative right, a loosely connected far-right, white nationalist movement based largely in the United States